Legislative elections were held in Cisleithania, the northern and western ("Austrian") crown lands of Austria-Hungary, on 14 and 23 May 1907 to elect the members of the 11th Imperial Council. They were the first elections held under universal male suffrage, after an electoral reform abolishing tax paying requirements for voters had been adopted by the Council and was endorsed by Emperor Franz Joseph earlier in the year. However, seat allocations were based on tax revenues from the States.

Electoral system
Under the shadow of the Russian Revolution of 1905 and large-scale demonstrations organized by the Social Democrats, the emperor to placate the public had a reform of the former five-class suffrage system, drafted by Minister-President Paul Gautsch von Frankenthurn. His successor, Baron Max Wladimir von Beck, pushed it through against fierce resistance from the Austrian House of Lords and the heir to the throne, Archduke Franz Ferdinand.

Elections in the constituencies of "the Kingdoms and Lands represented in the Imperial Council" were held according to a two-round system. If no candidate received the required absolute majority on May 14, only the two candidates receiving the most votes survived to the second round. on May 23. The 516 representatives of the constituent crown lands were thus elected, 130 from Bohemia, 106 from Galicia, 64 from Lower Austria and 49 from Moravia. The numerous political associations were again split according to ethnicity ("nations"), with a result that no government could ever rely on a stable majority.

Results

The right-wing Christian Social Party emerged as the largest bloc in Parliament, holding 95 of the 516 seats, followed by the Social Democratic Workers' Party of Austria with 50 seats. The former won most rural constituencies in Upper and Lower Austria, Styria, Salzburg, Tyrol, and Vorarlberg). It also achieved the majority in the capital, Vienna, benefitting from the popularity of the Christian Social mayor,  Karl Lueger. In the German constituencies of Bohemia and Moravia and in Carinthia, the German national parties (German People's Party etc.) did well. The Social Democrats had their strongholds in the cities other than Vienna: Graz, Salzburg, Innsbruck, Brno and Linz.

Voter turnout was 84.6%.

By parliamentary grouping

See also 

List of political parties in Austria
1907 Cisleithanian legislative election in the Czech lands
1907 Cisleithanian legislative election in the Kingdom of Dalmatia
1907 Cisleithanian legislative election in the Margraviate of Istria

References

1907 elections in Europe
1907
1907 in Austria-Hungary
May 1907 events